JDS Mochishio (SS-574) was a. She was commissioned on 5 March 1981.

Construction and career
Mochishio was laid down at Kawasaki Heavy Industries Kobe Shipyard on 9 May 1978 and launched on 12 March 1980. She was commissioned on 5 March 1981, into the 1st Submarine Group.

On 9 April 1986, a special remodeling work was completed to enable Harpoon's USM to be launched from the torpedo tube, which will increase the standard displacement by about 50 tons. She participated in Hawaii dispatch training from August 19 to November 21 of the same year.

Since April 1990, she has been dispatched to Hawaii and San Diego along with JDS Haruna, and from April 26 to June 2, she would participate in the RIMPAC '90 exercise.

She participated in RIMPAC '92 in 1992.

In July 1997, Mitsubishi Heavy Industries Kobe Shipyard & Machinery Works began remodeling work into a special submarine, removing torpedoes and setting up an auditorium for trainees. On August 1, the same year, she was changed to an auxiliary submarine, her hull number was changed to ATSS-8007, and she became a ship under the direct control of the 1st submarine group.

She was decommissioned on 10 March 2000.

Gallery

Citations

External links

1980 ships
Yūshio-class submarines
Ships built by Kawasaki Heavy Industries